Ken Gillanders OAM is an Australian botanist, horticulturist, nurseryman and plantman from Tasmania.

Ken, a nurseryman for over 50 years (now retired), and his wife Lesley started Woodbank Nursery on a bush block in Tasmania. Woodbank Nursery specialized in rare, exotic, unusual and native plants. As their nursery and its reputation grew so did their spectacular gardens containing many rare plants. Ken and Lesley collected seeds in Chile, Ecuador, New Zealand, China, South Africa, and Lesotho. Ken cultivated and propagated many Tasmanian natives including Leatherwood cultivars.

Ken has presented horticultural papers in the UK, Japan and New Zealand. He is co-author of "Know Your Rock Garden Plants and Dwarf Bulbs".

In 2002 retirement came, many Australian and overseas collectors were devastated describing the nursery's closure as a "tragedy". Nowadays they travel overseas taking photos of plants in flower, instead of collecting seed. The nursery was known as Woodbank Gardens from 2003 to early 2012 and hosted small events on occasions. In early 2012 and Ken and Lesley sold their nursery to another private owner. In June 2004, on the Queen's Birthday, Ken was awarded an Order of Australia Medal for service to Horticulture. Ken is currently the Australian Rhododendron Registrar.

References 

Australian gardeners
20th-century Australian botanists
Australian nurserymen
Australian horticulturists
Recipients of the Medal of the Order of Australia
Living people
Nurserymen
1930 births